Helena Merzin-Tamm ( Merzin; born 7 May 1972 in Tartu) is an Estonian actress.

Helena Merzin was born in Tartu to actor Leonhard Merzin and Tiiu Lukk. She has two half-sisters from her father's previous marriages. In 1990, she graduated from Tartu Secondary School No. 2 (now, the Miina Härma Gymnasium), before enrolling at the Estonian Academy of Music and Theatre, graduating in 1994. From 1994 until 2009, she worked at Vanemuine theatre in Tartu. Besides theatre roles she has played also in several films and television series.

Merzin-Tamm had been in a relationship actor and director Jüri Lumiste, with whom she has a son. Since 2007, she has been married to actor Raivo E. Tamm. The couple have a son.

Filmography

 Wikmani poisid (1995; in the role: Gunilla)
 Õnne 13 (1996–1999; in the role: Stella)
 Taarka (2008; in the role: Anna Raudkats)
 Lumekuninganna (2010; in the role: a woman)
 Mehetapja/Süütu/Vari (2017; in the role: Luise)
 Portugal (2018; in the role: Ann)

References

Living people
1972 births
Estonian stage actresses
Estonian film actresses
Estonian television actresses
20th-century Estonian actresses
21st-century Estonian actresses
Miina Härma Gymnasium alumni
Estonian Academy of Music and Theatre alumni
Actresses from Tartu